The Basilica of Holy Trinity in Kraków, Poland, is a Catholic basilica. Built in a gothic style, it also houses a monastery of the Order of Preachers (Dominicans). Its history dates from the year 1223.

Hyacinth, a Catholic saint, is buried in the church, as well as Polish monarch Leszek II the Black and Renaissance humanist Filippo Buonaccorsi.

References

External links

Holy Trinity
Dominican churches in Poland
1200s establishments
Burial sites of the Piast dynasty
The Most Holy Virgin Mary, Queen of Poland